Proaulopora is a Cambrian–Ordovician fossil genus of calcareous algae. It has been variously thought to belong to the green algae, red algae or cyanobacteria. It was originally established by the Russian paleontologist  in 1937, for species known from the Lower Cambrian of the western Altai Mountains.

In some older classifications of fossil algae genera, Proaulopora is placed in the family Proauloporaceae in order Proauloporales. In 2020, the genus was assigned to the cyanobacteria order Nostocales.

Proaulopora resembles some species of the extant rivulariacean genus Dichothrix, and has also been compared with the genus Calothrix.

Species
The genus contains the following species:

 Proaulopora composita Korde, 1973
 Proaulopora crassa Korde, 1973
 Proaulopora extincta Korde, 1973
 Proaulopora glabra Krasnopeeva, 1937 (Synonyms: Epiphyton (?) jacutii Maslov, 1937; Tubophyllum victori Krasnopeeva, 1955; Palaeonites jacutii Maslov, 1956; Vologdinella fragile Korde, 1957)
 Proaulopora longa Korde, 1973
 Proaulopora microspora Korde, 1973
 Proaulopora ordosia Liu, et al., 2020
 Proaulopora pachydermatica Liu, Wu, Yang & Riding, 2016
 Proaulopora rarissima Vologdin, 1937 (Synonyms: Proaulopora sajanica Korde, 1960; Proaulopora flexuosa Korde, 1973)
 Proaulopora recta Korde, 1973

As Vologdinella K.B. Korde, the following additional species are listed on AlgaeBase:
 Vologdinella grandis Korde, 1973
 Vologdinella pulchra Korde, 1973

It is unknown whether the above species have been transferred to Proaulopora or have become synonyms.

References

Further reading

External links
 Proaulopora A.G.Vologdin, 1962 GBIF
 Vologdinella K.B. Korde GBIF
 Vologdinella K.B. Korde WoRMS
 Amganella E.A.Reitlinger, 1959 GBIF
 Tubophyllum P.S.Krasnopeeva, 1955 GBIF
 Proaulopora paleobotany.ru

Nostocales
Fossil algae